Frontier Martial-Arts Wrestling is a Japanese professional wrestling promotion founded on July 28, 1989, by Atsushi Onita as  (FMW). The promotion specializes in hardcore wrestling involving weapons such as barbed wire and fire. They held their first show on October 6, 1989. In the late 1990s, FMW had a brief working agreement with Extreme Championship Wrestling, and as well had 14 DVDs released in the U.S. by Tokyopop. On March 4, 2015, FMW was resurrected under the name . With the resurrected FMW not holding any events since 2018, Onita announced in 2021 that he would be starting Frontier Martial-Arts Wrestling-Explosion (FMW-E) in which the promotion would specialize in exploding death matches.

The promotion was highlighted in the third season of the Vice TV's pro wrestling docuseries Dark Side of the Ring in September 2021.

History

FMW under Atsushi Onita (1989–1995)
The Atsushi Onita era of FMW originally consisted of a promotion that featured not only professional wrestling but the best martial arts fighters in the world.  Onita would bring in American talent that were known in Japan like Jos LeDuc and Dick Murdoch,  he had female talent in the promotion,  he had the best midget wrestlers in the world. The early days of FMW gave the fans and viewers a taste of everything that Onita had to offer. 

As the years progressed with FMW,  Onita decided to phase out the martial arts aspect of the company and focus strictly on professional wrestling.  Onita would go on to have violent and bloody matches like the first ever barbed wire match in the company where he would team with Tarzan Goto as they took on the team of Mitsuhiro Matsunaga and Jerry Flynn. Onita would use real barbed wire which resulted in him receiving a nasty gash on his arm.

Onita would take it one step further as he would go on to have the first ever exploding barbed wire match in August of 1990,  as he challenged his rival, Tarzan Goto.

As the years would progress further,  we would see an influx of American & Foreign talent begin to appear in FMW with talent ranging from Chris Jericho, Lance Storm, The Original Sheik, Sabu, Damián 666, Dr. Luther, Leon Spinks, Tiger Jeet Singh and so forth.

During these years of violence,  a young wrestler started to slowly work his way through the ranks and he would be known simply as Eiji Ezaki.  Ezaki was known as a prodigy in the world of wrestling and like a-lot of promotions in Japan do,  if they see something in a young talent,  that specific talent will go on excursion away from the company as they will learn and develop and when it is time to return to the promotion in Japan,  they will.  Ezaki would go on excursion to Mexico and wrestle for a couple of different promotions and while he was down there,  he developed the character of Hayabusa.

Hayabusa became a fan favorite in the promotion for his high flying style and it was known that Hayabusa was the "ace" of FMW.

Onita was fixing to retire once again from professional wrestling and his retirement match was held at the annual May 5th, Kawasaki Stadium show.  These stadium shows every May 5th would be the equivalent of WrestleMania in America.  This was FMW's biggest show of the year.  May 5th,  1995 would be the date where Onita would take on Hayabusa in an exploding barbed wire cage,  timebomb deathmatch.

This match now signified a changing of the guard as Onita would retire and Hayabusa would step up and be the face of FMW.

Atsushi Onita would go on and sell the company to FMW ring announcer,  Shoichi Arai and with that sale,  a new era of FMW was about to begin.

FMW under Shoichi Arai and Hiromichi Fuyuki (1995–2002)
The Shoichi Arai era of FMW would end up issuing changes to the promotion and gave the promotion a new look and feel.   Arai would slowly phase out the deathmatches that Atsushi Onita would help popularize and what put the company on the map and would bring in a more "sports entertainment" look and feel for the promotion that would be almost similar to that of the WWE. In a nod to the WWE, the old Brass Knuckles and Independent championships were abandoned and replaced with new titles, the World Entertainment Wrestling (WEW) championships.

Arai would enlist the help of professional wrestler , Kodo Fuyuki as both men would usher in this new era.    Having Fuyuki as the booker,  he would put forth his vision on how FMW should be run as Arai would sign the checks and book the arenas for the promotion.

During this time,  Atsushi Onita would return back to professional wrestling and start a faction that would rival FMW and they were known simply as  ZEN.   This group was loosely based on WCW's group known as The NWO.    Onita would run shows under the  ZEN label and these shows would feature FMW talent.

Hayabusa would continue to be featured as the ace of FMW and would go on to feud with the likes of Mr. Gannosuke, Kintaro Kanemura, and, Tetsuhiro Kuroda. 

As the booker of FMW, Kodo Fuyuki also continued to wrestle and he would go on to help form the top heel faction known as Team No Respect.

In 2000,  FMW would sign a distribution deal with Tokyopop which would help get their product out to a Western audience as FMW could now be seen officially on VHS and DVD in the United States.  They would go on to release 12 programs which were old FMW cards shortened down to feature the best matches or they were compilations of specific talent like Hayabusa.  They also featured dubbed commentary from Eric Gellar and John Watanabe.  Later releases would feature Dan Lovranski replacing Eric Gellar.

As the years progressed,  the audiences for the live shows began to decrease and Arai would slowly sink further and further into debt.

Tragedy struck the promotion on October 22, 2001, during a match with Hayabusa and Mammoth Sasaki.  Hayabusa attempted a springboard moonsault—one of his signature moves—but he accidentally slipped on the ropes and fell directly on his neck, breaking it and paralyzing him.

As the crowds continued to decrease, the amount of debt became too much for Arai, as he finally decided to announce that he has filed for bankruptcy and FMW would go on to have their final show on February 4, 2002.

As 2001 came to a close,  it was stated that Arai owed the sum of what would be the equivalent of one million US dollars to Yakuza (or Japanese Mafia) due to the money he would constantly borrow but never pay back.    Running out of options,  on May 16, 2002 , Shoichi Arai would commit suicide so his family could collect the life insurance to pay back the money owed to the Yakuza (or Japanese Mafia)

Closure and aftermath
The talent divided into two promotions: Kodo Fuyuki's World Entertainment Wrestling (WEW), the name of FMW's title governing body since 1999, and Mr. Gannosuke's Wrestling Marvelous Future (WMF). Some of the talent also made appearances on Onita's special shows. 

Following Fuyuki's death in 2003, most of the WEW talent under Kintaro Kanemura formed a successor promotion, Apache Pro-Wrestling Army, which continued the WEW titles until 2016 when Kanemura retired and closed the promotion. Today the WEW titles are administered by Tomohiko Hashimoto's Pro Wrestling A-Team promotion.

Cho Sento Puroresu FMW (revival, 2015–2018)
On April 3, 2015, Hideki Takahashi, Hayabusa and Choden Senshi Battle Ranger held a press conference, announcing they were reviving FMW under the new name "Chō Sentō Puroresu FMW". Takahashi would serve as the president and Hayabusa as the executive producer of the promotion, which would also feature participation from Atsushi Onita. The promotion held its first event on April 21. On October 30, 2015, they announced that they were reviving the FMW World Street Fight 6-Man Tag Team Championship, as they set a match to determine new champions on December 22.

In 2016, two tragedies had befallen FMW. On February 17, 2016, Ray would announce that she had inoperable stage three brain cancer after being diagnosed with a tumor in December 2015. She would succumb to the disease in 2018, she was 36 years old.  On March 3, 2016, Haybusa would pass away at his home from a brain aneurysm, he was 47 years old. 

On October 31, 2017, FMW founder Atsushi Onita retired after 43 years in the ring. The promotion held its most recent event as Chō Sentō Puroresu FMW in 2018. Although not officially closing once again the revival seemed to have been forgotten about.

FMW-Explosion (2021–present)
In 2018, Onita would come out of retirement at a Pro-Wrestling A-TEAM (Apache Army's successor promotion) event. After this he would come back as a wrestler having matches with Combat Zone Wrestling, Big Japan Pro-Wrestling, World Wonder Ring Stardom and DDT Pro-Wrestling.

In 2021, Onita announced that he would be starting Frontier Martial-Arts Wrestling-Explosion, a promotion under the FMW name that specialized in exploding death matches, a match type in which Onita became famous for. The new promotion will have Hidetaka Kajiki serving as president. Onita stated he got the idea for the promotion after All Elite Wrestling's 2021 Revolution PPV in which the event held an exploding barbed wire death match and seeing that there was still a market for these types of matches internationally in the pro wrestling world and with the popularity of online media streaming the new promotion was formed. The promotion, however, held its last card to date on December 19, 2021, after which Onita went freelance yet again. In October 2022, FMW-E started back up promoting cards.

Current FMW-E roster
Andreza Giant Panda
Atsushi Onita
Gabai Jai-chan (Psycho)
HASEGAWA (Kazutaka Hasegawa)
Hiro Takita
Kyoya Okazaki
Maku Donaruto
Mejiro Kid
Miss Mongol (Aki Kanbayashi)
Monster Leather 
Naoshi Sano
Nene Dai
Noriyuki Yoshida
Onryo
Pandita
Mr. Pogo #3
Raijin Yaguchi
Ricky Fuji
Shooter (Katsutoshi Niiyama)
Skull Reaper A-ji
Takumi Sakurai
Umanosuke Ueda #2
Yuichi Taniguchi

FMW alumni
Deceased individuals are indicated with a dagger (†).

Championships and accomplishments

Defunct

Tournaments

Events

Primary events

FMW Anniversary Show
Summer Spectacular
Fall Spectacular
Year End Spectacular

Interpromotional events
ECW/FMW Supershow (with ECW)
FMW/WWA in Los Angeles (with WWA)
FMW/MPW (with MPW)
FMW/LLPW/AJW (with LLPW and AJW)
Super Extreme Wrestling War (with ECW)

See also

List of FMW supercards and pay-per-view events
List of Frontier Martial-Arts Wrestling tournaments
Professional wrestling in Japan
List of professional wrestling promotions in Japan
All Japan Pro Wrestling
W*ING
Apache Pro-Wrestling Army

References

External links
FMW site. Includes history, wrestler profiles and title records
Wrestling-Titles.com: FMW
Official FMW Website

 
Japanese professional wrestling promotions
Organizations established in 1989
Organizations disestablished in 2002
Organizations established in 2015
1989 establishments in Japan
2002 disestablishments in Japan
2015 establishments in Japan